Broome, historically: Broom) is a small village in south Shropshire, England.

It has a railway station on the Heart of Wales Line, and is near to Aston on Clun, Clungunford and the small market town of Craven Arms. There is a pub — the Engine and Tender — currently closed. The River Clun flows nearby.

It is part of the civil parish of Hopesay.

See also
Listed buildings in Hopesay

External links

Villages in Shropshire